Pogonocherus parvulus is a species of beetle in the family Cerambycidae. It was described by John Lawrence LeConte in 1852. It is known from Canada and the United States.

References

Pogonocherini
Beetles described in 1852